The 3rd Coronation Trophy was a Formula Two motor race held on 25 May 1953 at Crystal Palace Circuit, London. The race was run over two heats of 10 laps and a final of 10 laps.

Tony Rolt in a Connaught Type A-Lea Francis won Heat 1 and set fastest lap in that heat. Peter Whitehead in a Cooper T24-Alta won Heat 2 and set fastest lap in that heat.

Rolt won the final, starting from pole by way of being fastest winner in the heats, and set fastest lap. Ken Wharton was second in a Cooper T23-Bristol and Peter Whitehead third.

Entries

Note - a blue background denotes entries that DNA (did not arrive)

Results

Heats

Final
Grid positions for the final were determined by the drivers' finishing times in the heats.

References 

Coronation Trophy
Coronation Trophy
Coronation Trophy